Emma O'Croinin (born 22 May 2003) is a Canadian swimmer. Her team won bronze in the women’s 4×200m freestyle relay at the 2019 World Aquatics Championships.

References

External links
 

2003 births
Living people
Canadian female freestyle swimmers
Swimmers from Edmonton